United States competed at the 1994 Winter Paralympics in Lillehammer, Norway. 30 competitors from United States won 43 medals including 24 gold, 12 silver and 7 bronze and finished 3rd in the medal table.

See also 
 United States at the Paralympics
 United States at the 1994 Winter Olympics

References 

1994
1994 in American sports
Nations at the 1994 Winter Paralympics